The Piano Man's Daughter is a novel by Timothy Findley, first published in 1995 by HarperCollins Canada. It was a nominee for the 1995 Giller Prize.

Summary

In the novel, narrator Charlie Kilworth recounts the history of his family, concentrating on his mother Lily and his grandmother Ede to find out who is his real father.

Adaptation

The novel was adapted into a television film in 2003 by Sullivan Entertainment.

1995 Canadian novels
Novels by Timothy Findley
Family saga novels
Canadian novels adapted into films
HarperCollins books